The 54th Idea Filmfare Awards ceremony, presented by The Times Group and Idea Cellular, was one of India's most prestigious awards ceremony, honoring the best Bollywood films of 2008. It took place on 28 February 2009 at the Yash Raj Studios, Mumbai. Actors Ranbir Kapoor and  Imran Khan hosted the show for the first part, while actresses Konkona Sen Sharma and Deepika Padukone hosted the show in the latter part. It was the first time that any of these actors hosted the awards ceremony. The ceremony was televised in India eight days later, on 8 March 2009.

The nominees for the various films were announced on 16 February 2009. Rock On!! led the ceremony with 15 nominations, followed by Jaane Tu... Ya Jaane Na with 12 nominations, Jodhaa Akbar with 11 nominations and Rab Ne Bana Di Jodi with 10 nominations respectively.

Rock On!! won 7 awards, including Best Supporting Actor (for Arjun Rampal) and Best Male Debut (for Farhan Akhtar), thus becoming the most-awarded film at the ceremony. 

Jodhaa Akbar won 5 awards under the main category, including Best Film, Best Director (for Ashutosh Gowariker) and Best Actor (for Hrithik Roshan). 

Priyanka Chopra won her first and only Best Actress award for her performance in Fashion, while Asin Thottumkal won Best Female Debut for her performance in Ghajini.

Awards and nominees

Main awards

Critics' awards

Technical Awards

Special awards

Multiple nominations and wins

The following films received multiple nominations.
10 nominations: Rab Ne Bana Di Jodi and Rock On!!
9 nominations: Jodhaa Akbar
7 nominations: Fashion, Ghajini and Jaane Tu... Ya Jaane Na 
5 nominations: Dostana

The following films received multiple awards.
5 wins: Jodhaa Akbar and Rock On!!
4 wins: Jaane Tu Ya Jaane Na
3 wins: Oye Lucky! Lucky Oye!
2 wins: Fashion, Ghajini, Mumbai Meri Jaan and Rab Ne Bana Di Jodi
1 win: Love Story 2050 and Singh Is Kinng

Awards tally
 – winner of the Filmfare Best Film Award,  – nominees for Best Film

 Note : In some cases, the number of nominations can be less than the number of awards won. This is explained by the fact that there are some awards which do not have any nominations. So, a film could have won an award which does not have any list of nominees. Also, Critics' Awards are not included in the number of awards won by the films.

See also
 List of highest-grossing Bollywood films

References

Filmfare Awards
2009 Indian film awards